Aglavashli (also, Alabashly, Kasum-Ismailov, Kasum-Izmaylov, and Kasym-Ismailov) is a village and municipality in the Shamkir Rayon of Azerbaijan.  It has a population of 1,925.

References 

Populated places in Shamkir District